"This Time's for Real" is a song by American metal band Ill Niño. The song was released as the second single from the band's second studio album Confession.

Music video
The song's music video shows a boxer training intercut with footage of the band performing the song.

Track listing

Charts

References

2003 songs
2004 songs
Ill Niño songs
Roadrunner Records singles
Song recordings produced by Bob Marlette
Songs written by Cristian Machado